Charles G. "Chuck" Cogan (January 11, 1928 – December 14, 2017) was an American academic and intelligence officer who served in the Central Intelligence Agency (CIA) from 1954 to 1991.

Background 
Cogan was born in Melrose, Massachusetts. He earned a Bachelor of Arts degree in history from Harvard University and served in the United States Army during the Korean War.

From 2006 until his death, he was an associate at Harvard University's Belfer Center for Science and International Affairs. At the CIA, Cogan's roles included chief of the Near East and South Asia Division in the CIA's Directorate of Operations (1979–1984) and Paris station chief (1984–1989). He graduated from the John F. Kennedy School of Government at Harvard University in 1992 with a Doctor of Public Administration degree.

Cogan died in Cambridge, Massachusetts in 2017.

Books
 Oldest Allies, Guarded Friends: the United States and France Since 1940, Praeger 1994, .
 Charles de Gaulle: A Brief Biography with Documents, Bedford Books of St. Martin's Press, 1996, .
 Forced to Choose: France, the Atlantic Alliance, and NATO - Then and Now, Praeger, 1997, .
 The Third Option: the Emancipation of European Defense, 1989-2000, Praeger, 2001, .
 French Negotiating Behavior: Dealing with La Grande Nation (USIP Press, 2003).
 La République de Dieu, Editions Jacob-Duvernet, 2008, .

References

External links
 
 www.drcharlesgcogan.net
 Charles Cogan

1928 births
2017 deaths
American spies
People of the Central Intelligence Agency
Officiers of the Légion d'honneur
Harvard University faculty
Harvard Kennedy School alumni
People from Melrose, Massachusetts
People from Cambridge, Massachusetts